Karaikkal Ammaiyar is a 1973 Indian Tamil Saiva mythological film, written and directed by A. P. Nagarajan and produced by EVR Films. The film's soundtrack was composed by Kunnakudi Vaidyanathan. The film stars Lakshmi, who played the younger-age Punithavathi role, and K. B. Sundarambal, who played the old-age role—as the title characters, with R. Muthuraman, Manorama, Suruli Rajan, V. S. Raghavan, S. V. Sahasranamam, Sivakumar and Srividya playing supporting roles. Karaikkal Ammaiyar is one of the three women saints among the 63 Nayanmars and is considered one of the greatest figure of Tamil literature. She was born in Karaikkal during the Chola period, a maritime center. Ammaiyar was a great devotee of Lord Shiva and she is believed to have lived during the 6th century, named Punithavathi.

Plot 
Punithavathi (Lakshmi), right from childhood, had great faith in Lord Shiva and worshipped him daily. As a young girl, she built a Sivalingam in sand, stunning people. Her father Dhanathatthan (V. S. Raghavan) was a Merchant. As a young girl, She chanted Namshivaya Mantra of Lord Shiva several times daily, and took care of devotees of Shiva coming to her village. Later, she was married to Paramathathan (R. Muthuraman) son of a wealthy merchant from Nagapattinam. A devotee of Lord Shiva continued to visit her home, whom she lavishly fed and gave clothes to. Once, her husband sent her two mangoes to be kept for him. That day, a hungry Siva devotee came to her residence. Punithavathi gave the guest Curd rice and one of the mangoes. Later, when the husband came home she served a mango, he asked for the second. She was at a loss and prayed to Lord Shiva (Sivakumar). Suddenly, a mango appeared in her hands. She served the mango to her husband, who found it divinely delicious compared to the previous one and asked her how she got the second fruit. Since he was not religious, she was scared of revealing the truth. He began suspecting her and asked her to get another fruit. She gave him a mango that she got by prayer, the fruit disappeared when he touched it. He realised that his wife was no ordinary woman.

But she was a divine person and he began to call her "Ammaiyar". As he could no longer treat her as his wife, he left her and moved to Madurai, where he married another woman named Bhakyavathi (Kumari Padmini), through whom he had child. They named her also Punithavathi (Baby Sumathi). Ammaiyar prayed to Lord Shiva asking for a boon—that she may worship Shiva as a disembodied wraith. Her wish was granted, leaving all her beauty and bodily being. She then took on different form (K. B. Sundarambal). She became a fiery form of Mount Kailash, climbing it upside down on her head. There, the Goddess Parvati (Srividya) asked about Ammaiyar. Shiva said that Ammaiyar is the mother, who takes care of us. Ammaiyar worshiped Shiva. Shiva greeted her, calling her "Ammaiyae" (my mother) and Ammaiyar replied "Appa" (father to all). Shiva asked for her wish, to which Ammaiyar replied "I want endless and delightful love with you, I don't want to be born, Even if I have any birth, I should not forgot you". Shiva asked her to visit him in Thiruvalangadu, which she again did, travelling on her hands and sang and performed a holy dance (Rudhra Thandavam). Ammaiyar visited Thiruvalangadu. Ammaiyar sang "Thiruvaalangattu mootha Thirupathigam".

Cast 
 Lakshmi as younger age Punithavathi
 K. B. Sundarambal as old age Punithavathi
 R. Muthuraman as Paramathathan
 Sivakumar as Lord Shiva
 Srividya as Goddess Parvathi
 V. S. Raghavan as Dhanathathar (Punithavathi's father)
 S. V. Sahasranamam as Nithipathi (Paramathathan's father)
 Manorama as Pallavi (Punithavathi's friend)
 Suruli Rajan as Pallavan (Paramathathan's friend)
 Gandhimathi as Anupallavi (Pallavai's second mother)
 Kumari Rukmini as Dharmavathi (Punithavathi's mother)
 Seethalakshmi as Neelambikai (Paramathathan's mother)
 Thilakam as Sathyavathi
 Kumari Padmini as Bhakyalakshmi (Paramathathan's second wife)
Ennathe Kannaiah as Pallavi's father
Karuppu Subbiah as Villager
T. K. S. Natarajan as Singer's assistant
S. Rama Rao as Katha kalakshepam singer
 Baby Sumathi as Punithavathi (Paramathathan's daughter)
 S. Varalakshmi as woman saint
 K. D. Santhanam as wealthy leprosy patient

Crew 
 Director: A. P. Nagarajan
 Script: A. P. Nagarajan
 Music: Kunnakudi Vaidyanathan
 Lyrics: Kannadasan and K. D. Santhanam
 Production: E. V. R. Films
 Studio: Venus Combines
 Art: Ganga
 Audiography: C. P. Kanniyappan and C. P. Gopal (Indoor)
 Audiography: V. Janarthanam (outdoor)
 Song & Re-Recording: S. P. Ramanathan (Prasad)
 Stills: Murugappan – Madhavan
 set: A. Nagarathinam and T. S. Venkatesan
 Set design: C. Govindasamy
 Process – Printing: Gemini Color lab
 Publicity: Markas Advertisement
 Outdoor: Sri Vijayalakshmi Photo Sounds
 Choreography: P. S. Gopalakrishnan
 Design: Baktha
 Printing: Asthophy Litho Works
 Production management: E. S. Mohan
 Associate director: K. K. sambath Kumar
 Camera man: Devuru

Reception 
The film was directed and written by A. P. Nagarajan. It was produced and distributed by EVR Films. The film star Lakshmi played the lead role for younger age "Punithavathi". K. B. Sundarambal was very popular during that time; she was to act as Karaikkal Ammaiyar in old age. R. Muthuraman gave his usual brilliant performance. Sivakumar played Lord Shiva role for his well speaking activity and performed the film climax; "Shiva Thandavam". Suruli Rajan and Manorama provided comic relief. S. Varalakshmi was acclaimed for her role as a woman saint and her song "Anbe Sivam Endru Paaduvome".

Sivakumar recalled this song Thakka Thakka Thakkavena Aadava in an interview. He said seeing him, K. B. Sundarambal expressed apprehension to A. P. Nagarajan that this Puthuppaiyan ( A New Boy) could do justice to the intricate number composed by Kunnakudi Vaidyanathan. A. P. Nagarajan gave Sivakumar one week to learn his steps. Sivakumar's fears were doubled as his partner was to be Srividya, who was a famed classical dancer. Training under choreographer P. S. Gopalakrishnan and his assistant Vimala for more than 12 hours for a day. Sivakumar managed to acquit himself creditably when the song was shot over 7 days.

Soundtrack 

Music was composed by Kunnakudi Vaidyanathan and lyrics were written by Kannadasan and K. D. Santhanam. Paaduvome Anbe Sivam Endru by that song that being in Sivaranjini steers and gradually to Punnagavarali by S. Varalakshmi scintillates when she sings Vedha Nayagaa, Sangeetha naayagaa the same strain of the song Aadu paambe. the next song Ulagamengum Nee Iruppai Sivapermane''' and Nayagan Vadivai Naan Parthen that bounds with joy of the marital bliss is a mesmerising semi – classical delight from P. Suseela.

The climax dance drama Shiva Thandavam is performed by the Sivakumar – Srividya pair, with choreography by P. S. Gopalakrishnan, music by Kunnakudi Vaidyanathan and the song by Thaka Thakavena Aadava Shiva Sakthi, sung by K. B. Sundarambal is the high point of the album karaikkal Ammaiyar watches, the bewitching dance of the divine couple at Thiruvalangadu and sings in an awestruck trance. The heavenly voice of K. B. S. that traverses unimaginable octaves exudes the behave and rasa of the song and KV's interludes which up the frenzy of the divine dance.

 Releases 
The film Karaikkal Ammaiyar was initially released in 1943, a black-and-white film directed and produced by C. V. Raman. Music was by Papanasam sivam. The film production and distribution was by Kandhan Company. B. Sarawathi played the film's title character. K. Sarangapani was (Paramathathan), V. A. Chellapa was (Lord Shiva), K. R. Chellam was (Bhakyalakshmi), T. S. Jaya was (Goddess Parvathi) and Baby Kalyani was (Punithavathi).

Saraswathi, now totally forgotten, played lead role while V. A. Chellapa as Siva was his usual brilliant self. T. S. Durairaj, M. E. Madhavan and Kunchithapatha Pillai were comic relief. T. S. Jaya, Popular those days, played Parvathi. The dance drama Shiva Thandavam was by the famous dance pair Nataraj – Sakuntala, the music was composed Papanasam Sivam''.

References

External links 
 
 

1973 films
1970s Tamil-language films
Hindu mythological films
Indian biographical films
Films scored by Kunnakudi Vaidyanathan
Films with screenplays by A. P. Nagarajan
Films directed by A. P. Nagarajan
Indian films based on actual events
Indian dance films
Films about Hinduism
Indian feminist films
Religious epic films
Indian epic films
Indian musical films
Films about royalty
Hindu devotional films
Films set in 1973
1970s feminist films
1970s musical films